The May Bumps 2004 were a set of rowing races held at Cambridge University from Wednesday 9 June 2004 to Saturday 12 June 2004. The event was run as a bumps race and was the 113th set of races in the series of May Bumps which have been held annually in mid-June since 1887. In 2004, a total of 171 crews took part (94 men's crews and 77 women's crews), with around 1500 participants in total.

Head of the River crews 
 Caius men rowed-over in 1st position, achieving the headship for the 6th time since 1998 (and 3rd consecutive headship).

 Emmanuel women bumped Newnham and held off a two-day challenge from Caius to take their first headship since 1999.

Highest 2nd VIIIs 
 The highest men's 2nd VIII for the 2nd consecutive year was Caius II.

 The highest women's 2nd VIII for the 2nd consecutive year was Emmanuel II.

Links to races in other years

Bumps Charts 
Below are the bumps charts for the 1st and 2nd divisions, with the men's event on the left and women's event on the right. The bumps chart represents the progress of every crew over all four days of the racing. To follow the progress of any particular crew, simply find the crew's name on the left side of the chart and follow the line to the end-of-the-week finishing position on the right of the chart.

May Bumps results
May Bumps
May Bumps
May Bumps